The Euler number (Eu) is a dimensionless number used in fluid flow calculations. It expresses the relationship between a local pressure drop caused by a restriction and the kinetic energy per volume of the flow, and is used to characterize energy losses in the flow, where a perfect frictionless flow corresponds to an Euler number of 0.  The inverse of the Euler number is referred to as the Ruark Number with the symbol Ru.

The Euler number is defined as

where
 is the density of the fluid.
 is the upstream pressure.
 is the downstream pressure.
 is a characteristic velocity of the flow.

An alternative definition of the Euler number is given by Shah and Sekulic

where
 is the pressure drop

Cavitation number 
The cavitation number has a similar structure, but a different meaning and use:

The cavitation number (Ca) is a dimensionless number used in flow calculations. It expresses the relationship between the difference of a local absolute pressure from the vapor pressure and the kinetic energy per volume, and is used to characterize the potential of the flow to cavitate.

It is defined as

where
 is the density of the fluid.
 is the local pressure.
 is the vapor pressure of the fluid.
 is a characteristic velocity of the flow.
Cavitation number is among the very few means to characterize a cavitating flow in a fluidic system. When the upstream pressure increase velocity of the working fluid increases as well. However, the velocity increase rate is one order of magnitude higher than the pressure increase. This means that, cavitation number follows a decreasing trend while upstream pressure increases. The first moment that cavitating bubbles appear in a system, inception happens. The corresponding cavitation number at this moment is inception cavitation number. According to the discussion above, this number is the highest number recorded in a system. Researchers are often interested in recording inception of cavitating flow at relatively low upstream pressure when they are aiming for the non-destructive applications on this phenomenon. With the development of cavitating flow, Cavitation number decreases until supercavitation happens which is the highest velocity and flowrate that the system can pass. As a result, the lower cavitation number shows the higher intensity on the cavitating flow. After supercavitation, the system is incapable of passing more fluid. However, the upstream pressure is increasing. As a result, cavitation number starts to follow an increasing trend. This trend could be seen in many published articles in the literature.

See also
 Darcy–Weisbach equation is a different way of interpreting the Euler number
 Reynolds number for use in flow analysis and similarity of flows

References

Further reading

Dimensionless numbers of fluid mechanics
Fluid dynamics
Leonhard Euler